Dachuan may refer to any of the following places in China:

Places 
As 大川:

 Dachuan town of Zhouqu County, Gannan, Gansu
 Dachuan town of Eryan Subdistrict, Maojian District, Shiyan, Hubei
 Dachuan town of Lushan County, Sichuan
 Dachuan subdistrict of Wangqing County, Yanbian Korean Autonomous Prefecture, Jilin

As 达川:

 Dachuan District of Dazhou City, Sichuan
 Dachuan town of Xigu District, Lanzhou, Gansu

Disambiguation pages